Compsolechia tardella is a moth of the family Gelechiidae. It was described by Francis Walker in 1864. It is found in Peru and Amazonas, Brazil.

Adults are blackish brown, the forewings irregularly cinereous (ash-gray) speckled, with two or three black occasionally obsolete spots in the disc and a few white and deep black submarginal streaks. The hindwings are dark cupreous brown.

References

Moths described in 1864
Compsolechia